Kaja Kallas (born 18 June 1977) is an Estonian politician who has been prime minister of Estonia since 2021, and is the first woman to serve in the role. The leader of the Reform Party since 2018, she was a member of the Riigikogu in 2019–2021, and 2011–2014. Kallas was a member of the European Parliament in 2014–2018, representing the Alliance of Liberals and Democrats for Europe. Before her election to Parliament, she was an attorney specialising in European competition law.

Early life and education 
Kaja Kallas was born in Tallinn on 18 June 1977. She is the daughter of Siim Kallas, who was the 14th prime minister of Estonia and later a European Commissioner. During World War II, after the Soviet Union had invaded and occupied Estonia in 1940, as part of the wave of executions and deportations from Estonia that followed, her mother Kristi, six months old at the time, was deported by the Stalinist regime to Siberia with her mother and grandmother in a cattle car and lived there until she was ten years old. Kallas's great-grandfather was Eduard Alver (1886–1939), one of the politicians leading the establishment of the Republic of Estonia in 1918, and also first head of the newly independent country's Estonian Police in 1918–1919. Apart from Estonian, Kallas patrilineally also has distant Latvian and Baltic German ancestry, as discovered by investigative journalists researching her father's ancestry shortly after his premiership.

Kallas graduated from the University of Tartu in 1999 with a bachelor's degree in law. She lived in France and Finland briefly while training in European law. From 2007, she attended the Estonian Business School, earning an Executive Master of Business Administration (EMBA) in economics in 2010.

Professional career 
Kallas became a member of the Estonian Bar Association in 1999, and an attorney-at-law in 2002. She became a partner in law firm Luiga Mody Hääl Borenius and Tark & Co, and worked as an executive coach in the Estonian Business School. She is also a member of the European Antitrust Alliance. In 2011, she was placed on inactive status as a member of the Estonian Bar Association. In November 2018, Kallas published her memoir MEP: 4 aastat Euroopa Parlamendis (MEP: Four Years in the European Parliament), in which she described her life and work in Brussels from 2014 to 2018.

Political career

Member of the Estonian Parliament (2011–2014) 
In 2010, Kallas decided to join the Estonian Reform Party. She ran for the Parliament of Estonia in 2011 for the Harju County and Rapla County constituency, receiving 7,157 votes. She was a member of the 12th Parliament of Estonia and chaired the Economic Affairs Committee from 2011 to 2014.

Member of the European Parliament (2014–2018) 
In the 2014 European Parliament election in Estonia, Kallas received 21,498 votes. In the European Parliament, Kallas served on the Committee on Industry, Research and Energy and was a substitute for the Committee on the Internal Market and Consumer Protection. She was a vice-chair of the Delegation to the EU–Ukraine Parliamentary Cooperation Committee as well as a member of the Delegation to the Euronest Parliamentary Assembly and Delegation for relations with the United States. In addition to her committee assignments, Kallas was a member of the European Parliament (MEP) Intergroup on the Digital Agenda, and was also a vice-chair of the Youth Intergroup.

During her period in Parliament, Kallas worked on the Digital Single Market strategy, energy, and consumer policies, and relations with Ukraine. In particular, she defended the rights of small and medium-sized enterprises, maintaining that borders in the digital world hinder the emergence of innovative companies. She is a proponent of innovation and frequently emphasises that regulations cannot and must not hinder the technological revolution.

Kallas served as rapporteur for six reports: opinion on the ePrivacy Regulation, civil law rules on robotics, on the Annual report on EU Competition Policy, and on Delivering a New Deal for Energy Consumers, legislation on Custom infringements and sanctions, and the own-initiative report on the Digital Single Market. During her time in Parliament, she was also nominated as a European Young Leader (EYL40). At the end of her term, she was cited by Politico as one of the 40 most influential MEPs, and one of the most powerful women in Brussels, who was highlighted for her understanding of technological issues.

Return to national politics (2017–2020) 
On 13 December 2017, the Reform Party leader Hanno Pevkur announced that he would no longer run for the party leadership in January 2018, and suggested that Kallas should run instead. After considering the offer, Kallas announced on 15 December 2017 that she would accept the invitation to run in the leadership election. Kallas won the leadership election held on 14 April 2018 and became the first female leader of a major political party in Estonia.

In the 2019 Estonian parliamentary election on 3 March, the Reform Party led by Kallas received about 29% of the vote, with the ruling Estonian Centre Party taking 23%. The Centre Party managed to form Jüri Ratas' second cabinet with the conservative Isamaa party and the far-right EKRE, leaving the Reform Party out of power. On 14 November 2020, Kallas was re-elected as leader of the Reform Party at a Reform Party Assembly.

Prime Minister of Estonia (2021–present) 

On 25 January 2021, after the resignation of Jüri Ratas as prime minister following a scandal, Kallas' first cabinet, a Reform-led coalition government with the Centre Party, was formed. In doing so, she became the first female prime minister in Estonia's history.

During the latter half of 2021, the 2021–2023 global energy crisis disrupted the Estonian economy; businesses were forced to temporarily shut down, while the public requested government aid to pay for the high electricity and heating prices. Kallas initially resisted calls for government aid, suggesting that the government should search for long-term solutions rather than handing out government benefits, and that a free market should not require consistent government intervention to keep people afloat. The energy crisis nearly caused the collapse of the coalition government. Kallas observed in a speech that the high cost of natural gas coupled with the Russia-Ukraine crisis was driving the increase in energy prices, and that the green energy measures Estonia adopted limited what the government could do to handle the crisis. In January 2022, Kallas announced a 245 million euro plan to reduce the cost of energy from September 2021 to March 2022. The energy crisis impacted her popularity in Estonia.

During the 2021–2022 Russo-Ukrainian crisis, Kallas said that the Nord Stream 2 natural gas pipeline was "a geopolitical project not an economic one" and urged that the pipeline be terminated. She also stated that Europe's dependence on Russian natural gas was a significant political problem. In January 2022, Kallas committed Estonia to donating howitzers to Ukraine to assist in its defence against a possible Russian invasion, pending German approval as the howitzers were originally purchased from Germany. When Germany delayed in giving an answer, Estonia sent American-made Javelin anti-tank missiles instead in the first weeks of February 2022. Following Russia's recognition of the Donetsk and Luhansk people's republics, Kallas demanded that the European Union introduce sanctions on Russia. Kallas was praised domestically for her leadership during the Russia-Ukraine crisis. Subsequently, her approval rating soared, making her Estonia's most popular politician.

After the 2022 Russian invasion of Ukraine started on 24 February, Estonia along with other allies triggered Article 4 of NATO. Kallas pledged to support Ukraine with political and materiel support. By April 2022, 0.8% of Estonia's GDP per capita in military equipment had been handed over to Ukraine. Kallas has been praised both in Estonia and internationally as a leading pro-Ukrainian voice in the war, with the New Statesman calling her "Europe's New Iron Lady". She also strongly supported the admission of Ukraine to the European Union, saying that there was "a moral duty" to do so.

After her resignation on 14 July 2022, Kallas' second cabinet was sworn in on 18 July. The new government was a three-party coalition by the Reform Party, Social Democratic Party, and Isamaa. Her previous government had lost its parliamentary majority after the Centre Party left the coalition. As prime minister, Kallas attracted international attention as a leader in efforts to support Ukraine during the Russian invasion, delivering more military equipment to Ukraine as a proportion of GDP per capita than any other country in the world. In September 2022, in the context of a plan by three other bordering nations to restrict Russian tourists, she said: "Travel to the European Union is a privilege, not a human right." She added that it was "unacceptable that citizens of the aggressor state are able to freely travel in the EU, whilst at the same time people in Ukraine are being tortured and murdered." In February 2023, Kallas was mentioned as a possible candidate to replace NATO Secretary-General Jens Stoltenberg following his expected retirement that same year.

Personal life 
In 2002, Kallas married Roomet Leiger and they divorced in 2006. She lived together with former Estonian politician and businessman Taavi Veskimägi who served as the country's Minister of Finance. They have one son, and separated in 2014. In 2018, she married Arvo Hallik, a banker and investor. He has two children from a previous relationship.

Apart from her native Estonian, Kallas is fluent in English, Russian and French.

Awards and honours
European Prize for Political Culture by Hans Ringier Foundation (2022)
 Grand Cross of the Order of the Star of Romania (2021)

Other activities 
Since 2020, Kallas is a member of the Board of Trustees of the Friends of Europe. Additionally, she is a member of the European Council on Foreign Relations, an advisory board member of the Women Economic Forum, and a patron of the Model European Union Tallinn. She is also a mentor of the European Liberal Youth, a member of the European Young Leaders, a MEP ambassor of Erasmus for Young Entrepreneurs, a member of the MEP Library Lovers Group, a political member of the European Internet Forum, a member of the extended board of the European Forum for Renewable Energy Sources, a member of the Global Young Leaders, a member of the Women Political Leaders, and a MEP ambassador of the European Entrepreneurship Education Network.

References

External links 

 

|-

1977 births
21st-century Estonian lawyers
21st-century Estonian politicians
21st-century Estonian women politicians
21st-century memoirists
Estonian people of Baltic German descent
Estonian people of Latvian descent
Estonian Reform Party MEPs
Estonian Reform Party politicians
Estonian women lawyers
Grand Crosses of the Order of the Star of Romania
Living people
Members of the Riigikogu, 2011–2015
Members of the Riigikogu, 2019–2023
Members of the Riigikogu, 2023–2027
MEPs for Estonia 2014–2019
Politicians from Tallinn
Prime Ministers of Estonia
University of Tartu alumni
Women members of the Riigikogu
Women MEPs for Estonia
Women prime ministers